Devavrat Shah is a professor in the Electrical Engineering and Computer Science department at MIT.  He is director of the Statistics and Data Science Center at MIT. He received a B.Tech. degree in computer science from IIT Bombay in 1999 and a Ph.D. in computer science from Stanford University in 2004, where his thesis was completed under the supervision of Balaji Prabhakar.

Research
Shah's research focuses on the theory of large complex networks which includes network algorithms, stochastic networks, network information theory and large scale statistical inference.  His work has had significant impact both in the development of theoretical tools and in its practical application.  This is highlighted by the "Best Paper" awards he has received from top publication venues such as ACM SIGMETRICS, IEEE INFOCOM and NIPS. Additionally, his work has been recognized by the INFORMS Applied Probability Society via the Erlang Prize, given for outstanding contributions to applied probability by a researcher not more than 9 years from their PhD and the ACM SIGMETRICS Rising Star award, given for outstanding contributions to computer/communication performance evaluation by a research not more than 7 years from their PhD. He is a young distinguished alumnus of his alma mater IIT Bombay.

Awards
Shah has received many awards, including
 Erlang Prize from Applied Probability Society of INFORMS 2010
 ACM SIGMETRICS/Performance best student paper award 2009 (supervised)
 ACM SIGMETRICS Rising Star Award 2008
 Neural Information Processing System (NIPS) outstanding paper award 2008 (supervised)
 ACM SIGMETRICS/Performance best paper award 2006
 NSF CAREER Award 2006
 George B. Dantzig best dissertation award from INFORMS 2005
 IEEE INFOCOM best paper award 2004
 President of India Gold Medal at Indian Institute of Technology-Bombay 1999

Industry
Shah co-founded Celect, Inc. in 2013.

References

Stanford University alumni
MIT School of Engineering faculty
Indian computer scientists
Living people
Year of birth missing (living people)